BKK Architects is an Australian architectural practice based in Melbourne, Victoria. The firm was established in 2000 by architects Tim Black and Simon Knott, whom are graduates of the Royal Melbourne Institute of Technology. Realized commissions include a broad spectrum of residential, commercial, public and institutional buildings, as well as infrastructure and urban design projects.

Current undertakings include Melbourne's landmark Clark Street Tower  and the Central Dandenong Urban Masterplan. The philosophy of BKK is design-based problem solving and is not limited to specific building typologies, although an emerging focus in their work is place making. The firm has strong research interests and established affiliations with several Melbourne educational institutions.

Notable projects

Research 
BKK Architects is involved with several high-profile architectural research projects in affiliation with various partners. These include the Bi-Directional Evolutionary Structural Optimization (BESO) project in collaboration with RMIT University and Soundwall technologies working in concert with Australian acoustic engineering firms and plastic manufacturers.

Media 

In 2003 Simon Knott and Stuart Harrison established a weekly Tuesday night architecture radio show on 3RRR. Called The Architects, the duo was later joined with Rory Hyde and Christine Phillip and focused on boarding the understanding of architecture in the wider community. In 2005 Knott and Hyde won the AIA Victoria Bates Smart Award for Architecture in the Media.

In 2013 ABC Radio National featured an eight-week segment on Art Nation called The Good, the Bad and the Ugly hosted by Knott and Harrison. In 2012 the show won the Bates Smart Award for Architecture in the Media. Segments featured The Arts Prescient, Dockland and Fed Square.

See also

Architecture of Australia

References

External links 

 BKK Architects
 BKK Architects on Architecture Au

Architecture firms of Australia
Australian companies established in 2000